Al-Kabir (Kabīr ) is one of the Names of God in Islam, meaning "The Great." It may refer to:

 A short form of the name Abdul Kabir ('Servant of the Great')
 Bugha al-Kabir, 9th century Turkic general
 Ali Bey Al-Kabir, Mamluk Sultan of Egypt from 1760 to 1772
 Saud al-Kabir (disambiguation)